Cyril Trigg (8 April 1917 – 9 April 1993) was an English professional footballer who made 268 appearances in the Football League playing for Birmingham, which was renamed Birmingham City in 1943.

Trigg was born in Measham, Leicestershire. He spent the whole of his League careernineteen yearswith Birmingham City, for whom he made 291 appearances and scored 72 goals in all competitions. The Second World War started when he was 22 years old, so his career was severely disrupted by the conflict, in which he served in the Royal Air Force in India and Burma. He also appeared as a guest player for West Ham United during the war. He was twice Birmingham's leading scorer, firstly in the 1946–47 season, despite playing a third of his matches at right back, and again in 1950–51, by which time he was exclusively a centre forward.

He moved to Stourbridge in 1954 as player-coach, and retired in 1957. He died in Birmingham aged 76.

Honours
Birmingham City
 Football League Second Division: 1947–48

References

1917 births
People from Measham
Footballers from Leicestershire
1993 deaths
English footballers
Association football fullbacks
Association football forwards
Bedworth United F.C. players
Birmingham City F.C. players
Stourbridge F.C. players
English Football League players
West Ham United F.C. wartime guest players
Royal Air Force personnel of World War II
Military personnel from Leicestershire